Sussy may refer to:

People
 Jean-Baptiste Collin de Sussy (1750–1826), French senior official and politician
 Jean-Baptiste Henry Collin de Sussy (1776–1837), French politician and son of Jean-Baptiste Collin de Sussy
 Sussy (Masahito Furuya) [ja], lead guitarist of Sex Machineguns
 Susy Derqui (died 1955), Argentine actress and cabaret performer

Other uses
 Sussy (meme), an internet meme and slang term
 Sussy, archaic name for Suxy [fr], a locality in Chiny, Belgium

See also
 Sussey, a commune in Bourgogne-Franche-Comté, France
 Sussi (disambiguation)
 Sussie (disambiguation)
 Sus (disambiguation)
 Suss (disambiguation)